The  is a group of Kofun period burial mounds located in what is now the Nakadai neighborhood of the town of Yokoshibahikari, Chiba Prefecture in the Kantō region of Japan. The site was designated a National Historic Site of Japan in 1958.

Overview
The Shibayama  site is located on the plateau on the east bank of the Kido River, which flows through the central Kujukuri Plain in north-central Bōsō Peninsula. The cluster consists of two keyhole-shaped kofun and 13 dome-shaped kofun. The site was excavated in 1956 by Waseda University, and is noteworthy for a unique group of haniwa depicting a complete a funeral procession.

Tonozuka
It has a total length of 88 meters and was constructed in two tiers. The opening of the tumulus is orientated to the west and the tumulus was surrounded by a double rectangular moat. It was covered in haniwa, many of which had been preserved by having fallen into the soft mud of the moat. In addition to many cylindrical haniwa, the north side of the moat contained haniwa shaped as horses, dogs, cows, female deer, wild boar, birds (ducks and other waterfowl). Haniwa depicting men and women were found from the area of the posterior circular portion, and morning-glory shaped haniwa and two anthropomorphic haniwa were found on the north side. The horizontal stone burial chamber was painted red on the interior. Grave goods included  beads such as magatama, gold rings, iron swords, gold bells, and bronze ornamental horse fittings.

Total length 88 meters 
Anterior rectangular portion 58 meters wide x 10 meters high, 2-tier
Posterior circular portion 58 meter diameter x 10.4 meters high, 2-tiers

Himezuka
The  is the smaller of the two keyhole-shaped tumuli, and has a total length of 58.8 meters. It was constructed in parallel to, and 30 meters to the north, of the Tonozuka.  An excavation in the year 2000 found that it also had a double moat. The horizontal stone-lined burial chamber has a total length of 5.72 meters. As with the Tonozuka, grave goods included magatama, gold rings, bronze ornaments, a large-sized iron sword, iron dagger, gold-copper decorative horse fittings, etc. The haniwa at the Himezuka were found to be in situ and were in excellent preservation. Of especial interest was a depiction of people and horses in a funeral procession extending for 50 meters in a line from the front of the tumulus to the back of the posterior circular portion, which contained the opening to the burial chamber. This procession included a group of men on horses wearing hats, and four horses with sandals, five warriors, followed by a group of 16 men with a wheel-shaped haniwa, a group of seven women, followed by ten more men. Among these figures were a warrior with a beard, a farmer with a hoe, and a man kneeling with a musical instrument.  These haniwa were all dated to the latter half of the 6th century AD and represent the peak of haniwa expression.

Total length 58.8 meters 
Anterior rectangular portion 35 meters wide x 4.5 meters high
Posterior circular portion 35 meter diameter x 5 meters high

Other tumuli
The other tumuli in the cluster are all circular-type, with diameters of around 20 meters. They are well preserved and remain unexcavated.

The site is located a five-minute walk from the Yokoshiba Nakadai bus stop on the airport shuttle bus from Keisei Narita Station.

See also
List of Historic Sites of Japan (Chiba)

References

External links
Chiba Prefecture official site 
Yokoshibahikari town official home page 
Shibayama Haniwa Museum 

Kofun
History of Chiba Prefecture
Yokoshibahikari
Archaeological sites in Japan
Historic Sites of Japan